Maroof Raza (born 1959) is a retired Indian Army officer with experience in counter-insurgency operations. He is a well known media commentator on global, military and security issues. His ‘talks’ range from the ‘threats of terrorism’ to India-Pakistan and the
Kashmir issue, Sino-Indian relations, and what India should do to become a great power. He also lectures on ‘Leadership Lessons from the armed forces’. His most
recent book is titled 'Contested Lands: India, China and the Boundary Dispute' (Westland 2021). His earlier books include " Kashmir's untold story" along with Iqbal
Malhotra (Bloomsbury,2019) and Confronting Terrorism (Penguin 2020), among other works..

Maroof is often invited to address gatherings of corporate leaders and senior members at military/academic institutions on a range of issues by invitation of FICCI
and CII, as also by Goldman Sachs (India), Citibank, Deloitte, YPOs, YI-CII bodies, at the Civil Services Academy, Mussoorie at India’s National Defence College,
Delhi, and at events organised by ISB, OSB, SpeakIn, and at certain Lit-Fests. He has also spoken at institutions in the US, UK and in the Gulf countries.Maroof has
lectured to large Corporate gatherings, at India's military training establishment, the foreign service and civil services, on geo strategic issues, military history and
leadership; as also overseas.

Currently a Consulting Editor (Strategic Affairs) for the Times TV network, where he hosts the weekend a strategic affairs tv show, "Latitude" on Times Now.
Additionally he also hosts a weekly show, ' The Defenders' on Sansad tv. He also appears regularly on prime time tv shows on Times TV networks many tv
channels. His recentTV series on 'Tales of Valour' on Times Now and Mirror Now, is now also available on Discovery plus channel. Both these series (of 12
episodes each) won the top awards as long forwmat tv shows. His earlier TV series on the 'Line of Duty' is in the Limca Book of Records, and an episode of this won
an award at the Rome Film Festival in 2005. Maroof Raza is also the publisher the monthly magazine: "SALUTE to the Indian soldier".

Education
Maroof was educated in India and the UK. In India at the Mayo College, Ajmer, and in St.Stephen's College, ( History Hons 1976-79) Delhi. He later did the MA in
War Studies from King's College (1991) , London and M.Phil in International Relations from Cambridge University (1992). Maroof Raza has served in the Indian
army from 1980 to 1994 in The Grenadiers and the Mechanised Infantry Regiments, and as an instructor at the Indian Military Academy. He has authored several
books and his essays and articles have been published in all of India's leading publications and w as recently awarded an Hony. D.Phil by Amity University, in Noida
(U.P).

Career
In 1994, he was awarded the Times of India Fellowship, and has held Visiting Fellowships at the Centre for Policy Research, Delhi, at the Henry L. Stimson Centre, Washington and at the War Studies Department of King's College, London. Between 1998 and 2007, He was a Visiting Professor at Middlesex University and its Regional Director (for South Asia). He continues to lecture extensively in India and abroad on ‘India's Security Concerns. His articles are published regularly in leading newspaper of India.
He is a consultant and strategic affairs expert on Times Now. Apart from his appearances on news debates, he publishes and writes for Salute magazine And  has anchored and presented a 20 part series on the Indian armed forces, titled Line of Duty.  An episode from this series, on the Siachen Glacier won an Award in the military documentary section at the Film Festival in Rome in 2005. This TV series has entered the Limca Book of Records as India's first military reality show. He is also the anchor of a strategic affairs show called Latitude and India Risk Report for the same channel.

Maroof Raza is the Mentor of Security Watch India. He has appeared on almost all of India's leading television channels as an expert on military and security matters and on BBC's World Service radio programmes. He is currently the Strategic Affairs Editorial Adviser to Times Now. He is also the Editor-at-Large of FAUJI INDIA Magazine.   Maroof also did a guest role in 2014 Bollywood film Holiday: A Soldier Is Never Off Duty.

Maroof Raza also  acts as the Board of Adviser – Strategic Risk and Global Geo-Political Expert with IIRIS Consulting. He comes armed with more than 20 years of experience as a mentor, anchor, correspondent, lecturer, writer and a commentator on issues of National Security and Strategic Affairs. His in-depth knowledge, experience, and his association with leading TV channels including TIMES NOW, NDTV, BBC & more makes him one of the most sought after speakers internationally on the subjects of National and International Risk and Security Affairs.

He has authored two books: Low-Intensity Conflicts: The new dimension to India’s military commitments and Wars and no Peace over Kashmir. He has edited a book titled Generals and Governments in India and Pakistan. As the General Editor of Military Affairs series of Har Anand Publications, since 2001, he has edited twelve volumes. Most recently, he has edited a book on Indian terrorism challenges titled Confronting Terrorism (Penguin Books, India).

References

External links
Maroof Profile
India Risk Report
Author saluteindia.org

Living people
Indian male television journalists
Date of birth missing (living people)
Alumni of King's College London
Indian Army officers
1959 births